Kyrylo Romanovych Siheyev (born 16 May 2004) is a Ukrainian professional footballer who plays as a central midfielder for Oleksandriya, on loan from Shakhtar Donetsk.

Club career

Shakhtar Donetsk
Born in Horlivka, Donetsk Oblast, Siheyev is a product of the nearby Shakhtar Donetsk academy. He played several seasons in the Ukrainian Premier League Reserves.

Loan to Oleksandriya
In March 2023 went on loan to Oleksandriya in the Ukrainian Premier League. He made his league debut for Oleksandriya as a substitute against Dnipro-1 on 4 March.

References

External links
 
 

2004 births
Living people
People from Horlivka
Ukrainian footballers
Association football midfielders
Ukraine under-21 international footballers
FC Shakhtar Donetsk players
FC Oleksandriya players
Ukrainian Premier League players
Sportspeople from Donetsk Oblast